Carl Schultén (1677 in Västmanland – 1730 in Lund) was a Swedish orientalist who was a professor and later the rector of the Academia Gustavo-Carolina (modern-day University of Tartu) in 1709, and the rector for Lund University in 1721. He previously was the first ever professor of eastern languages at the university and later became the third ever professor of theology there. He was the son of Pastor Samuel Schultenius and Margareta Schultin, and his aunt was Haqvin Spegel's wife. His brother, was a professor in Turku.

References

Orientalists
Swedish scientists
Rectors of the University of Tartu
Academic staff of Lund University
Academic staff of the University of Tartu
1677 births
1730 deaths